FC Gomel, or FK Homiel, is a Belarusian football club, playing in the city of Gomel. Their home stadium is Central Stadium.

History 
Teams from Gomel (usually city or raion selection or railway-based team Lokomotiv, but not always) played in the Belarusian SSR championships since the early 1920s. In 1946, Belorusian SSR league for one season becomes one of the zones of the USSR 3rd level league, and Lokomotiv Gomel became the first city team to play in the Soviet league.

The modern Gomel team was founded in 1959 as Lokomotiv Gomel. They played at the 2nd level of Soviet football between 1959 and 1968. The results varied between seasons, as the team managed to finish 1st in their zone in 1962 as well as last in 1959 and 1963. However, because Soviet league system structure was changing almost every season in the 1950s and 1960s, Lokomotiv wasn't promoted or relegated until another league reorganisation in 1969.

Gomselmash played at the 3rd level of Soviet football between 1969 and 1989, until further league reorganisation in 1990, after which the team was relegated to the 4th level.

In 1992, Gomselmash joined the newly formed Belarusian Premier League. The first years were unsuccessful and the team relegated in 1995. They changed name to the current one, FC Gomel, the same year. In 1998, Gomel returned to Premier League and achieved much better results than before (champions title in 2003, 2nd place in 2007 and 3rd in 1999). The team also won the Belarusian Cup in 2002 and made it to the final in 2004.

In 2012, they played English club Liverpool in the UEFA Europa League qualifying rounds. In the first leg they lost 0–1 and lost again away at Anfield in the second leg 3–0.

Name changes 
1959: Lokomotiv Gomel
1965: Spartak Gomel
1969: Gomselmash Gomel
1976: Mashinostroitel Gomel
1978: Gomselmash Gomel
1995: Gomel

Honours 
 Belarusian Premier League
 Winners (1): 2003
 Runners-up (1): 2007
 3rd place (2): 1999, 2011
 Belarusian Cup
 Winners (3): 2002, 2011, 2022
 Runners-up (1): 2004
 Belarusian Super Cup
 Winners (1): 2012
 Runners-up (1): 2023

Current squad 
As of March 2023

League and Cup history
 Soviet Union

1 Finished last in its zone, but saved from relegation due to 2nd level (Class B) expansion from 7 to 9 territorial zones (from 101 to 142 teams) in 1960.
2 No promotion to the Top League in 1962 was awarded due to Top League (Class A) reduction from 22 to 20 teams in 1963. Lokomotiv's play-off performance didn't affect its next season league allocation. Winning their zone allowed them to stay on the second level (Class B), which was reduced from 10 zones (150 teams) in 1962 to a single group of 18 teams in 1963.
3 Finished last, but saved from relegation due to 2nd level (Class A Second Group) expansion from 18 to 27 teams in 1964.
4 Play-off with the best-placed Belarusian team from the 3rd level (Class B) in 1968 for the right to play on the 2nd level (Class A Second Group) in 1969.
5 Play-off with the lowest-placed Belarusian team from the 2nd level (Class A Second Group) in 1969 for the right to play in Class A Second Group (which becomes the 3rd level league next year due to introduction of Class A Top Group as the Top level) in 1970.
6 Finished last in its zone, but saved from relegation due to 3rd level (Class A Second Group, renamed to Second League since next season) expansion from 3 to 6 territorial zones (from 66 to 124 teams) in 1971.
7 In 1973, every draw was followed by a penalty shoot-out, with a winner gaining 1 point and loser gaining 0.
8 Though finished 14th from the 22 teams in 1989, Gomselmash relegated as the Second League (3rd level) was reduced from 9 zones (195 teams) to 3 zones (66 teams) and the Second Lower League with 9 zones was introduced as a 4th level.

 Belarus

European history

Managers 

 Pavel Baranov (1959)
 Gleb Rabikov (1960–61)
 Vadim Radzievski (1962 – July 63)
 Sergei Korshunov (July 1963)
 Vasiliy Yermilov (1964–65)
 Alexander Sagreski (1966)
 Vladimir Eremeev (1967–68)
 Viktor Korotkevich (1969–70)
 Leonard Adamov (1971–72)
 Leonid Yerochovich (July 1973)
 Yevgeniy Glemboski (July 1973–74)
 Viktor Korotkevich (1975 – July 77)
 Alexander Tschirimisin (July 1977–80)
 Kasimir Symanski (1981–83)
 Nikolay Kiselyov (1984)
 Viktor Korotkevich (1985 – July 87)
 Valery Janotschkin (July 1, 1987 – Dec 31, 1987)
 Yuriy Golovey (July 1988)
 Alexander Pryazhnikov (July 1988–90)
 Kasimir Symanski (1991)
 Vladimir Astratenko (1992–93)
 Viktor Korotkevich (1993–94)
 Nikolai Gorjunov (1994–96)
 Yuriy Grunov (1997)
 Valery Janotschkin (Jan 1, 1998 – May 15, 1999)
 Vyacheslav Akshaev (Jan 1, 1999 – June 30, 2000)
 Alexandr Kuznetsov (August 2000 – May 1)
 Valery Janotschkin (May 15, 2001 – Sept 1, 2001)
 Sergei Podpaly (Aug 1, 2001 – June 26, 2004)
 Alexandr Kuznetsov (July 1, 2004 – Aug 12, 2005)
 Nikolai Gorjunov (Aug 15, 2005 – July 1, 2006)
 Viktor Papayev (July 5, 2006 – Oct 27, 2006)
 Vladimir Golmak (interim) (Oct 28, 2006 – Jan 8, 2007)
 Anatoliy Yurevich (Jan 9, 2007 – Aug 5, 2008)
 Andrey Yusipets (Aug 15, 2008 – Aug 30, 2009)
 Leonid Borsuk (interim) (Sept 1, 2009 – Dec 13, 2009)
 Oleg Kubarev (Dec 14, 2009 – Dec 9, 2012)
 Alyaksey Merkulaw (Dec 10, 2012–)

References

External links 
Official Website
Club's fans' site
FC Gomel at UEFA.COM

 
Football clubs in Belarus
Sport in Gomel
1959 establishments in Belarus
Association football clubs established in 1959